Grisollea is a genus of plants in the family Stemonuraceae.

Species include:
 Grisollea myriantha Baill.
 Grisollea thomassetii Hemsl.

 
Asterid genera
Taxonomy articles created by Polbot
Taxa named by Henri Ernest Baillon